This is a list of the mammal species recorded in Chad. There are 136 mammal species in Chad, of which four are critically endangered, two are endangered, eight are vulnerable, and two are near threatened. One of the species listed for Chad can no longer be found in the wild.

The following tags are used to highlight each species' conservation status as assessed by the International Union for Conservation of Nature:

Some species were assessed using an earlier set of criteria. Species assessed using this system have the following instead of near threatened and least concern categories:

Order: Afrosoricida (tenrecs and golden moles) 

The order Afrosoricida contains the golden moles of southern Africa and the tenrecs of Madagascar and Africa, two families of small mammals that were traditionally part of the order Insectivora.

Family: Tenrecidae (tenrecs)
Subfamily: Potamogalinae
Genus: Potamogale
 Giant otter shrew, Potamogale velox LC

Order: Tubulidentata (aardvarks) 

The order Tubulidentata consists of a single species, the aardvark. Tubulidentata are characterised by their teeth which lack a pulp cavity and form thin tubes which are continuously worn down and replaced.

Family: Orycteropodidae
Genus: Orycteropus
 Aardvark, O. afer

Order: Hyracoidea (hyraxes) 

The hyraxes are any of four species of fairly small, thickset, herbivorous mammals in the order Hyracoidea. About the size of a domestic cat they are well-furred, with rounded bodies and a stumpy tail. They are native to Africa and the Middle East.

Family: Procaviidae (hyraxes)
Genus: Procavia
 Cape hyrax, Procavia capensis LC

Order: Proboscidea (elephants) 

The elephants comprise three living species and are the largest living land animals.
Family: Elephantidae (elephants)
Genus: Loxodonta
African bush elephant, L. africana

Order: Sirenia (manatees and dugongs) 

Sirenia is an order of fully aquatic, herbivorous mammals that inhabit rivers, estuaries, coastal marine waters, swamps, and marine wetlands. All four species are endangered.

Family: Trichechidae
Genus: Trichechus
 African manatee, Trichechus senegalensis VU

Order: Primates 

The order Primates contains humans and their closest relatives: lemurs, lorisoids, tarsiers, monkeys, and apes.

Suborder: Strepsirrhini
Infraorder: Lemuriformes
Superfamily: Lorisoidea
Family: Galagidae
Genus: Galago
 Senegal bushbaby, Galago senegalensis LR/lc
Suborder: Haplorhini
Infraorder: Simiiformes
Parvorder: Catarrhini
Superfamily: Cercopithecoidea
Family: Cercopithecidae (Old World monkeys)
Genus: Erythrocebus
 Patas monkey, Erythrocebus patas LR/lc
Genus: Chlorocebus
 Tantalus monkey, Chlorocebus tantalus LR/lc
Genus: Papio
 Olive baboon, Papio anubis LR/lc
Subfamily: Colobinae
Genus: Colobus
 Mantled guereza, Colobus guereza LR/lc

Order: Rodentia (rodents) 

Rodents make up the largest order of mammals, with over 40% of mammalian species. They have two incisors in the upper and lower jaw which grow continually and must be kept short by gnawing.

Suborder: Hystricognathi
Family: Hystricidae (Old World porcupines)
Genus: Hystrix
 Crested porcupine, Hystrix cristata LC
Family: Thryonomyidae (cane rats)
Genus: Thryonomys
 Lesser cane rat, Thryonomys gregorianus LC
Suborder: Sciurognathi
Family: Sciuridae (squirrels)
Subfamily: Xerinae
Tribe: Xerini
Genus: Xerus
 Striped ground squirrel, Xerus erythropus LC
Tribe: Protoxerini
Genus: Heliosciurus
 Gambian sun squirrel, Heliosciurus gambianus LC
Family: Nesomyidae
Subfamily: Cricetomyinae
Genus: Cricetomys
 Gambian pouched rat, Cricetomys gambianus LC
Family: Muridae (mice, rats, voles, gerbils, hamsters, etc.)
Subfamily: Deomyinae
Genus: Acomys
 Western Saharan spiny mouse, Acomys airensis LC
 Johan's spiny mouse, Acomys johannis LC
Genus: Uranomys
 Rudd's mouse, Uranomys ruddi LC
Subfamily: Gerbillinae
Genus: Desmodilliscus
 Pouched gerbil, Desmodilliscus braueri LC
Genus: Dipodillus
 North African gerbil, Dipodillus campestris LC
Genus: Gerbillus
 Agag gerbil, Gerbillus agag DD
 Lesser Egyptian gerbil, Gerbillus gerbillus LC
 Pygmy gerbil, Gerbillus henleyi LC
 Sudan gerbil, Gerbillus nancillus DD
 Balochistan gerbil, Gerbillus nanus LC
 Nigerian gerbil, Gerbillus nigeriae LC
 Greater Egyptian gerbil, Gerbillus pyramidum LC
 Tarabul's gerbil, Gerbillus tarabuli LC
Genus: Tatera
 Kemp's gerbil, Tatera kempi LC
 Fringe-tailed gerbil, Tatera robusta LC
Genus: Taterillus
 Congo gerbil, Taterillus congicus LC
 Gracile tateril, Taterillus gracilis LC
Subfamily: Murinae
Genus: Arvicanthis
 African grass rat, Arvicanthis niloticus LC
Genus: Lemniscomys
 Typical striped grass mouse, Lemniscomys striatus LC
 Heuglin's striped grass mouse, Lemniscomys zebra LC
Genus: Mastomys
 Guinea multimammate mouse, Mastomys erythroleucus LC
 Verheyen's multimammate mouse, Mastomys kollmannspergeri LC
 Natal multimammate mouse, Mastomys natalensis LC
Genus: Praomys
 Dalton's mouse, Praomys daltoni LC
Family: Ctenodactylidae
Genus: Massoutiera
 Mzab gundi, Massoutiera mzabi LC

Order: Lagomorpha (lagomorphs) 

The lagomorphs comprise two families, Leporidae (hares and rabbits), and Ochotonidae (pikas). Though they can resemble rodents, and were classified as a superfamily in that order until the early 20th century, they have since been considered a separate order. They differ from rodents in a number of physical characteristics, such as having four incisors in the upper jaw rather than two.

Family: Leporidae (rabbits, hares)
Genus: Poelagus
 Bunyoro rabbit, Poelagus marjorita LR/lc
Genus: Lepus
 Cape hare, Lepus capensis LR/lc
 African savanna hare, Lepus microtis LR/lc

Order: Erinaceomorpha (hedgehogs and gymnures) 

The order Erinaceomorpha contains a single family, Erinaceidae, which comprise the hedgehogs and gymnures. The hedgehogs are easily recognised by their spines while gymnures look more like large rats.

Family: Erinaceidae (hedgehogs)
Subfamily: Erinaceinae
Genus: Atelerix
 Four-toed hedgehog, Atelerix albiventris LR/lc
Genus: Hemiechinus
 Desert hedgehog, Hemiechinus aethiopicus LR/lc

Order: Soricomorpha (shrews, moles, and solenodons) 

The "shrew-forms" are insectivorous mammals. The shrews and solenodons closely resemble mice while the moles are stout-bodied burrowers.

Family: Soricidae (shrews)
Subfamily: Crocidurinae
Genus: Crocidura
 Fox's shrew, Crocidura foxi LC
 Savanna shrew, Crocidura fulvastra LC
 Bicolored musk shrew, Crocidura fuscomurina LC
 Small-footed shrew, Crocidura parvipes LC
 Savanna path shrew, Crocidura viaria LC
 Voi shrew, Crocidura voi LC
 Yankari shrew, Crocidura yankariensis LC

Order: Chiroptera (bats) 

The bats' most distinguishing feature is that their forelimbs are developed as wings, making them the only mammals capable of flight. Bat species account for about 20% of all mammals.

Family: Pteropodidae (flying foxes, Old World fruit bats)
Subfamily: Pteropodinae
Genus: Eidolon
 Straw-coloured fruit bat, Eidolon helvum LC
Genus: Epomophorus
 Gambian epauletted fruit bat, Epomophorus gambianus LC
 Ethiopian epauletted fruit bat, Epomophorus labiatus LC
Genus: Micropteropus
 Peters's dwarf epauletted fruit bat, Micropteropus pusillus LC
Family: Vespertilionidae
Subfamily: Vespertilioninae
Genus: Glauconycteris
 Butterfly bat, Glauconycteris variegata LC
Genus: Neoromicia
 Tiny serotine, Neoromicia guineensis LC
 Banana pipistrelle, Neoromicia nanus LC
 Rendall's serotine, Neoromicia rendalli LC
 Somali serotine, Neoromicia somalicus LC
Genus: Nycticeinops
 Schlieffen's bat, Nycticeinops schlieffeni LC
Genus: Pipistrellus
 Rüppell's pipistrelle, Pipistrellus rueppelli LC
 Rusty pipistrelle, Pipistrellus rusticus LC
Genus: Scotoecus
 Dark-winged lesser house bat, Scotoecus hirundo DD
Genus: Scotophilus
 White-bellied yellow bat, Scotophilus leucogaster LC
 Greenish yellow bat, Scotophilus viridis LC
Family: Rhinopomatidae
Genus: Rhinopoma
 Egyptian mouse-tailed bat, R. cystops 
 Lesser mouse-tailed bat, Rhinopoma hardwickei LC
 Greater mouse-tailed bat, Rhinopoma microphyllum LC
Family: Molossidae
Genus: Chaerephon
 Gland-tailed free-tailed bat, Chaerephon bemmeleni LC
 Nigerian free-tailed bat, Chaerephon nigeriae LC
 Little free-tailed bat, Chaerephon pumila LC
Genus: Mops
 Midas free-tailed bat, Mops midas LC
Family: Emballonuridae
Genus: Taphozous
 Hamilton's tomb bat, Taphozous hamiltoni NT
 Mauritian tomb bat, Taphozous mauritianus LC
 Naked-rumped tomb bat, Taphozous nudiventris LC
Family: Nycteridae
Genus: Nycteris
 Hairy slit-faced bat, Nycteris hispida LC
 Large-eared slit-faced bat, Nycteris macrotis LC
 Egyptian slit-faced bat, Nycteris thebaica LC
Family: Megadermatidae
Genus: Lavia
 Yellow-winged bat, Lavia frons LC
Family: Rhinolophidae
Subfamily: Rhinolophinae
Genus: Rhinolophus
 Rüppell's horseshoe bat, Rhinolophus fumigatus LC
Subfamily: Hipposiderinae
Genus: Asellia
 Trident leaf-nosed bat, Asellia tridens LC
Genus: Hipposideros
 Sundevall's roundleaf bat, Hipposideros caffer LC
 Noack's roundleaf bat, Hipposideros ruber LC

Order: Pholidota (pangolins) 

The order Pholidota comprises the eight species of pangolin. Pangolins are anteaters and have the powerful claws, elongated snout and long tongue seen in the other unrelated anteater species.

Family: Manidae
Genus: Manis
 Giant pangolin, Manis gigantea LR/lc
 Ground pangolin, Manis temminckii LR/nt

Order: Carnivora (carnivorans) 

There are over 260 species of carnivorans, the majority of which feed primarily on meat. They have a characteristic skull shape and dentition.
Suborder: Feliformia
Family: Felidae (cats)
Subfamily: Felinae
Genus: Acinonyx
 Cheetah, A. jubatus
Northwest African cheetah, A. j. hecki 
Genus: Caracal
Caracal, C. caracal 
Genus: Felis
African wildcat, F. lybica 
Sand cat, F. margarita 
Genus: Leptailurus
Serval, L. serval 
Subfamily: Pantherinae
Genus: Panthera
Lion, P. leo 
West African lion, P. l. leo 
Leopard, P. pardus 
Family: Viverridae
Subfamily: Viverrinae
Genus: Genetta
Common genet, G. genetta 
Rusty-spotted genet, G. maculata 
Family: Herpestidae (mongooses)
Genus: Herpestes
Egyptian mongoose, H. ichneumon 
Genus: Mungos
 Banded mongoose, M. mungo  
Family: Hyaenidae (hyaenas)
Genus: Crocuta
 Spotted hyena, C. crocuta 
Genus: Hyaena
Striped hyena, H. hyaena 
Suborder: Caniformia
Family: Canidae (dogs, foxes)
Genus: Canis
 African golden wolf, C. lupaster 
Genus: Vulpes
 Pale fox, V. pallida  
Rüppell's fox, V. rueppellii 
Fennec fox, V. zerda 
Genus: Lupulella
 Side-striped jackal, L. adusta  
Genus: Lycaon
 African wild dog, L. pictus 
Family: Mustelidae (mustelids)
Genus: Ictonyx
 Saharan striped polecat, Ictonyx libyca  
 Striped polecat, Ictonyx striatus  
Genus: Mellivora
Honey badger, M. capensis 
Genus: Hydrictis
Speckle-throated otter, H. maculicollis 
Genus: Aonyx
 African clawless otter, A. capensis

Order: Perissodactyla (odd-toed ungulates) 

The odd-toed ungulates are browsing and grazing mammals. They are usually large to very large, and have relatively simple stomachs and a large middle toe.

Family: Rhinocerotidae
Genus: Diceros
 Black rhinoceros, D. bicornis extirpated
Western black rhinoceros, D. b. longipes 
Genus: Ceratotherium
 White rhinoceros, C. simum extirpated
Northern White rhinoceros, C. s. cottoni

Order: Artiodactyla (even-toed ungulates) 

The even-toed ungulates are ungulates whose weight is borne about equally by the third and fourth toes, rather than mostly or entirely by the third as in perissodactyls. There are about 220 artiodactyl species, including many that are of great economic importance to humans.

Family: Suidae (pigs)
Subfamily: Phacochoerinae
Genus: Phacochoerus
 Common warthog, Phacochoerus africanus LR/lc
Subfamily: Suinae
Genus: Potamochoerus
 Red river hog, Potamochoerus porcus LR/lc
Family: Hippopotamidae (hippopotamuses)
Genus: Hippopotamus
 Hippopotamus, Hippopotamus amphibius VU
Family: Giraffidae (giraffe, okapi)
Genus: Giraffa
 Kordofan giraffe, Giraffa camelopardalis antiquorum EN
Family: Bovidae (cattle, antelope, sheep, goats)
Subfamily: Alcelaphinae
Genus: Alcelaphus
 Hartebeest, Alcelaphus buselaphus LR/cd
Genus: Damaliscus
 Topi, Damaliscus lunatus LR/cd
Subfamily: Antilopinae
Genus: Gazella
 Dorcas gazelle, Gazella dorcas VU
 Rhim gazelle, Gazella leptoceros EN
 Red-fronted gazelle, Gazella rufifrons VU
Genus: Nanger
 Dama gazelle, Nanger dama CR
Genus: Ourebia
 Oribi, Ourebia ourebi LR/cd
Subfamily: Bovinae
Genus: Syncerus
 African buffalo, Syncerus caffer LR/cd
Genus: Tragelaphus
 Giant eland, Tragelaphus derbianus LR/nt
 Bushbuck, Tragelaphus scriptus LR/lc
 Sitatunga, Tragelaphus spekii LR/nt
 Greater kudu, Tragelaphus strepsiceros LR/cd
Subfamily: Caprinae
Genus: Ammotragus
 Barbary sheep, Ammotragus lervia VU
Subfamily: Cephalophinae
Genus: Cephalophus
 Red-flanked duiker, Cephalophus rufilatus LR/cd
 Yellow-backed duiker, Cephalophus silvicultor LR/nt
Genus: Sylvicapra
 Common duiker, Sylvicapra grimmia LR/lc
Subfamily: Hippotraginae
Genus: Addax
 Addax, Addax nasomaculatus CR
Genus: Hippotragus
 Roan antelope, Hippotragus equinus LR/cd
Genus: Oryx
 Scimitar oryx, Oryx dammah EW
Subfamily: Reduncinae
Genus: Kobus
 Waterbuck, Kobus ellipsiprymnus LC
 Kob, Kobus kob LC
Genus: Redunca
 Bohor reedbuck, Redunca redunca LC

References

External links

See also
List of chordate orders
Lists of mammals by region
List of prehistoric mammals
Mammal classification
List of mammals described in the 2000s

Chad
Chad
Mammals